is a Japanese football player. Kyushu Soccer League club J-Lease FC.

Career
Kota Ogino joined J2 League club Kyoto Sanga FC in 2016. In July, he moved to Kamatamare Sanuki. On 12 February 2019, Brazilian club Londrina announced, that they had loaned Ogino and his teammate Takuya Shimamura.

On 13 February 2021, Ogino moved to Kyushu Soccer League club J-Lease FC.

Club statistics
Updated to 22 February 2018.

References

External links

Profile at Kyoto Sanga

1997 births
Living people
Association football people from Kyoto Prefecture
Japanese footballers
Japanese expatriate footballers
J2 League players
Japan Football League players
Kyoto Sanga FC players
Kamatamare Sanuki players
Tegevajaro Miyazaki players
Londrina Esporte Clube players
Veertien Mie players
Association football midfielders
Japanese expatriate sportspeople in Brazil
Expatriate footballers in Brazil